James Stone may refer to:
 James M. Stone (1817–1880), politician in the Massachusetts House of Representatives
 James W. Stone (1813–1854), United States Representative from Kentucky
 James L. Stone (1922–2012), United States Army officer and Medal of Honor recipient
 James Stone (academic administrator) (1810–1888), first president of Kalamazoo College
 James Stone (American football) (born 1992), American football player
 James Stone (executive) (born 1947), American business executive
 James Stone (physicist), astrophysicist on the faculty of the IAS
 James Riley Stone (1908–2005), Canadian military commander
 Jamie Stone (politician) (born 1954), Scottish politician
 Jamie Magnus Stone (born 1985), Scottish film director and animator

See also
 Stein Stone (James Nollner Stone Sr., 1882–1926), college football and basketball coach
 James Stone, ring name of American wrestler James Maritato
 J. Riley Stone (1886–1978), Wisconsin State Assemblyman
 Jimmy Stone (1876–1942), English cricketer